Scopula benenotata  is a moth of the family Geometridae. It was described by Prout in 1932. It is endemic to Madagascar.

This species is similar to Scopula latitans Prout, 1920 in structure. The forewings are a little narrower with more oblique termen, the colouring is warmer – a pinkish buff or light pinkish cinnamon, and it has larger cell-dots.

References

Endemic fauna of Madagascar
Moths described in 1932
Moths of Africa
Moths of Madagascar
benenotata
Taxa named by Louis Beethoven Prout